Usingeriessa onyxalis is a moth of the family Crambidae. It is native to southern Texas, Mexico and Central America. It is an introduced species in Hawaii.

The larvae are thought to be aquatic.

References

Acentropinae
Moths of North America